Soldier is a song written and recorded by Harvey Andrews in 1972.   It was released as the B-side of the single "In the Darkness", and later featured on the album Writer of Songs.

The song was inspired by an event in Belfast, Northern Ireland. In 1971 Sergeant Michael Willetts of 3 PARA cleared a room in Springfield Road RUC Police Station of civilians because a bomb with a short burning fuse had been planted by the Provisional IRA. After the room had been cleared, an Inspector who helped local people flee then slammed the door to the room which contained the bomb, but realizing the door was not strong enough to absorb the blast, he pressed his body against the door, shielding the people on the other side. The charge exploded, and he was seriously injured.

Sgt Willetts whose post was actually down a hall heard the screams, instead of saving himself he choose to run toward the bomb after shouting orders to another soldier to evacuate upstairs. He was left with a man and woman with their two children. He pushed them into a corner and stood between them and the bomb. A chunk of metal from a locker was blasted into the back of his head and he died on the operating table two hours later.

As his and other bodies were carried out Irish Republican supporters clapped, jeered and sang rebel songs to the disbelief of other soldiers and police.

Harvey Andrews was so struck by the incident that he wrote the song to highlight the senselessness of violence and to make the point that soldiers, too, are human, and that Sgt Willetts had laid down his life for people who considered British soldiers to be nothing more than "murderers". (The incident of the soldier embracing the bomb was poetic licence.) Broadcasts of Andrews' record were banned for some time by the BBC lest feelings be exacerbated in the nationalist community of Northern Ireland, or the British public be incited to attack innocent Irish people. The Ministry of Defence advised British soldiers not to sing the song in pubs where it may incite strong emotive behaviour. Some have interpreted this as a ban.

Harvey Andrews' authorship is not always widely known, and many incorrect stories about the song's origin circulate. Harvey Andrews intended the song to transcend sectarianism, but some have wrongly interpreted it as the glorification of military heroism.

The song's merits were debated in Folk Review.  It was criticised by Leon Rosselson for "catastrophic naivety", and Dick Gaughan compared it unfavourably to Andrews's song "Hey Sandy".

Sales of the record "In the Darkness" / "Soldier" could not keep up with demand in Northern Ireland.  A record shop on Shankhill Road in Belfast broadcast the song by loudspeaker, and subsequently sold 5000 copies.

Harvey Andrews has voiced some regrets over the song's legacy for the Troubles:

References

 Brummie heroes. Harvey Andrews

External links
 (mp3 clip)

Songs about the military
Songs about soldiers
Songs about The Troubles (Northern Ireland)
1972 songs
Songs banned by the BBC